Dolní Újezd is a municipality and village in Přerov District in the Olomouc Region of the Czech Republic. It has about 1,200 inhabitants.

Administrative parts
Villages of Skoky and Staměřice are administrative parts of Dolní Újezd.

References

Villages in Přerov District